Organic India is a multi-national company founded in 1997 by couple Bharat Mitra and Bhavani Lev (née Holly Bronfman), in Lucknow, India, that produces halal certified organic herbal and Ayurvedic health products. The company is  most known for their line of organically grown tulsi teas, which are sold in India, the US, Canada, and the UK.

The company created an organic, natural, non-toxic, herbal version of the colourful dyes used in India's annual Holi celebration, and operates a retail store in Maharashtra, India. The company also exports organically-grown flowers, with Germany as its major market.

Organic India works directly with marginal farmers in tribal villages, providing seeds, fertilisers, organic certification, and assumption of risk in case of crop failure. It owns  of arable land in Uttar Pradesh, including in Rajasthan and Gujarat, and the Vasundhara Acres Organic India LLP in Madhya Pradesh.

References

External links
Official Website
Organic Farmers Group
Natural & Organic Products

Ayurvedic companies
Companies based in Lucknow
Indian brands
Indian companies established in 1997
1997 establishments in Andhra Pradesh
Agriculture companies established in 1997
Food and drink companies established in 1997